Sven Michael Spengemann (born October 3, 1966) is a German-Canadian lawyer, bureaucrat and politician, who was elected to represent the electoral district of Mississauga—Lakeshore in the House of Commons of Canada in the 2015 federal election.

He was successfully re-elected in the subsequent 2019 federal election and the 2021 federal election.

Spengemann announced on May 18, 2022 that he would be resigning as the MP for Mississauga—Lakeshore to accept a role with the United Nations.

Early life
Spengemann immigrated to Canada at age 14 with his family, and settled in the Credit Woodlands neighbourhood of Mississauga. He completed his secondary education at The Woodlands School.

Education
Spengemann earned a B.Sc. in psychology from the Mississauga campus of the University of Toronto in 1990.

Spengemann obtained an LL.B from Osgoode Hall Law School of York University in 1998 and an LL.M focused on European Union Law from the College of Europe in Bruges, Belgium, in 1999. He earned a second LLM (international law) and a doctorate of juridical science at Harvard Law School in the field of political and constitutional theory, under the direction of Anne-Marie Slaughter, in 2006. In the course of his studies, Spengemann earned a number of awards and distinctions, including a Canada-US Fulbright Scholarship (2001).

Career
From 1991 to 1995, Spengemen worked with Toronto-Dominion Bank, supervising their Green Line Investor Services. During this time, he oversaw a team of client service employees and compliance management.

From 2003 to 2005, Spengemann served as a Senior Policy Analyst at the Government of Canada’s Privy Council Office, examining national security law and international regulatory issues in the Canada-U.S. bilateral relationship.

From 2005 to 2012, Spengemann served as a legal adviser and senior constitutional officer with the United Nations Assistance Mission for Iraq. During his service, he negotiated legal protocols with U.S. and Coalition military forces to ensure security, medical and operational support for the UN's activities in the country. Additionally, he led a team of international and Iraqi experts to assist the new Parliament of Iraq and Kurdistan Regional Government with constitutional and legislative reforms, including oil & gas management, human rights, institutional design and federalism.

His work in Iraq earned him an Osgoode Hall Gold Key alumni award and recognition as a democracy expert in the University of Toronto’s 'Boundless' Campaign. In 2011, he spent a four-month sabbatical leave as a visiting scholar at the university's Munk School of Global Affairs and Public Policy, with a joint appointment to the Balsillie School of International Affairs at the University of Waterloo.

Following his U.N. service in 2012, he became a visiting professor and BMO Visiting Fellow at York University, teaching graduate courses at its Glendon School of Public and International Affairs. He resigned from this role in 2014 to enter electoral politics.

Politics
In 2012, Spengemann became a member of the Liberal Party Riding Association of Mississauga–Lakeshore and took on the portfolio of Vice President for Communications and Outreach. In early 2014, Spengemann declared his intention to seek the federal Liberal nomination for the riding and won the nomination in September of that year. Spengemann is a supporter of Justin Trudeau.

In the 2015 federal election, Spengemann defeated Conservative incumbent Stella Ambler to win the new Mississauga—Lakeshore electoral district, and secured his seat in both the 2019 and 2021 elections.

Spengemann is fluent in English and French, as well as German.

Electoral record

References

External links

Living people
Liberal Party of Canada MPs
Harvard Law School alumni
Members of the House of Commons of Canada from Ontario
1966 births
People from Etobicoke
Politicians from Berlin
Politicians from Mississauga
Politicians from Toronto
Lawyers in Ontario
German emigrants to Canada
Osgoode Hall Law School alumni
College of Europe alumni
University of Toronto alumni
Academic staff of the University of Toronto
Academic staff of York University
Canadian officials of the United Nations
Canadian civil servants
Canadian bankers
21st-century Canadian politicians